Sartai is a lake located in Rokiškis and Zarasai municipalities, northeastern Lithuania. The lake's 79 km  shoreline is the longest in Lithuania. There are six islands in the lake. River Šventoji flows through it.

The lake was famous for the annual horse races that had been organized on the frozen lake near Dusetos. Nowadays this tradition is abandoned because of safety requirements. The race is organised at a hippodrome on the shore of the Sartai Lake.

References

Sartai
Rokiškis District Municipality
Zarasai District Municipality